Benjamin Bradley Bolger (born 1975) is an American perpetual student who has earned 17 degrees  and claims to be the second-most credentialed person in modern history after Michael W. Nicholson (who has 30 degrees). Like Nicholson, Bolger is from Michigan.

Biography

Benjamin Bolger was born to Donald, an engineer with General Motors, and Loretta, a teacher, and was raised in Grand Haven, Michigan. At the age of two, his parents were both seriously injured when the family was involved in a near-fatal car accident caused by a drunk driver; Bolger says this encouraged him to make the most out of his life.

In first grade, he was diagnosed with dyslexia. Special education programs did not help him, and in fourth grade, his mother began home-schooling Bolger, while undergoing a divorce. At the age of 12, Bolger began taking classes at Muskegon Community College, graduating with an A.A. by the age of 17. He then transferred with those credits to the University of Michigan, majored in sociology, and graduated summa cum laude with a 4.0 grade point average. From there, he took an internship with the Clinton Administration with Press Secretary Mike McCurry. Bolger's mother has moved with him to each college and university he attended and helps him by reading his assignments to him aloud.

Bolger entered Yale Law School when he was 19, but dropped out when he was unable to compensate for his dyslexia. After receiving additional training for his dyslexia, he enrolled at Oxford University, thus beginning his quest for degrees. After accumulating several master's degrees, he received his first doctorate in 2008 at the age of 33, in Design from Harvard Graduate School of Design. He has also studied in graduate programs at the University of Pennsylvania, Georgetown University, the College of William and Mary, and Dartmouth College. His mother accompanied and supported him through much of his education to help with his work, from Ann Arbor to Oxford.

, he teaches a General Education course at Harvard College and is working remotely toward a 17th degree, from Cambridge University.

Degrees
 1992 – Muskegon Community College (Associate of Arts)
 1994 – University of Michigan (Bachelor of Arts in sociology)
 1997 – University of Oxford (Master of Science in sociology)
 1998 – University of Cambridge (Master of Philosophy in sociology and politics of modern society)
 2000 – Stanford University (Master of Arts in education)
 2001 – Teachers College, Columbia University (Master of Arts in politics of education)
 2002 – Graduate School of Architecture, Planning and Preservation, Columbia University (Master of Science in real estate development)
 2002 – Harvard University (Master of Design in urban planning and real estate)
 2004 – Brown University, Watson Institute for International and Public Affairs (Master of Arts in developmental studies)
 2004 – Dartmouth College (Master of Arts in liberal arts)
 2007 – Brandeis University (Master of Arts in coexistence and conflict)
 2007 – Skidmore College (Master of Arts in Humanities)
 2008 – Harvard University (Doctor of Design in urban planning and real estate)
 2014 – Ashland University (Master of Fine Arts in creative writing)
 2016 - University of Tampa (Master of Fine Arts in creative writing)
 2016 - West Virginia Wesleyan College (Master of Fine Arts in nonfiction)
 2017 - University of Georgia (Master of Fine Arts in screenwriting)

He has also completed some coursework at Yale Law School (in 1995, towards a JD) and at Boston College's Lynch School of Education (in 2004, towards an MA in higher education).

Personal life
Bolger endeavors to sleep only 4–5 hours a night. He has two children, a daughter named Benjamina Brook and a son named Benjamin Blitz who are both homeschooled.

References

External links
 Official web site 
 

1975 births
Living people
Alumni of the University of Cambridge
Alumni of the University of Oxford
Ashland University alumni
Brown University alumni
Columbia Graduate School of Architecture, Planning and Preservation alumni
Dartmouth College alumni
Harvard Graduate School of Design alumni
Heller School for Social Policy and Management alumni
People from Flint, Michigan
Skidmore College alumni
Stanford University alumni
Teachers College, Columbia University alumni
University of Michigan College of Literature, Science, and the Arts alumni